Ignatius Ziadé (also Ignace Ziade; , 26 January 1906 in Herharaya, Lebanon – 31 March 1994 in Beirut, Lebanon) was the Archbishop of the Maronite Catholic Archeparchy of Aleppo and the Maronite Catholic Archeparchy of Beirut.

Life

Igntius Ziadé was born in Herharaya in the Keserwan District, Mount Lebanon Governorate, in  Lebanon. He was consecrated to priesthood at the age of 23 on 26 May 1929 in Syria. On 27 April 1946 he was appointed Bishop of the Maronite Catholic Archeparchy of Aleppo. His episcopal ordination was celebrated on November 24, 1946 by then-Maronite Patriarch of Antioch Anthony Peter Arida, and his co-consecrators were François Ayoub, Archeparch of Cyprus and Pietro Dib, Eparch of Cairo. On 26 January 1952 Ziadé he was appointed to the seat Maronite Archbishop of Beirut. At the age of 80 years Ignatus Ziadé presented his resignation on April 4 1986. Emeritus Archbishop Ignatius Ziadé died at the age of 88 years, on 31 March 1994 in Beirut. Ziadé had  been for 65 years as Maronite priest and bishop for 47 years. In these decades of his pastoral ministry, he served as co-consecrator of Elie Farah, Abdallah Bared, Antoine Torbey, Paul-Emile Saadé, and Bechara Boutros al-Rahi.

References

Citations

Sources

External links
 http://www.catholic-hierarchy.org/bishop/bziade.html

1906 births
1994 deaths
Lebanese Maronites
20th-century Maronite Catholic bishops